= Sustain our Africa =

- Formation: 2011
- Type: International sustainability organisation
- Purpose: Advocacy, development and communications
- Headquarters: 89A Bree Street
- Location: Cape Town, South Africa
- Region served: Africa
- Website: www.sustainourafrica.org

Sustain our Africa is an African-based public advocacy organisation and forum focused on increasing awareness, facilitating, and promoting sustainable development intuitives in Africa. The organisation's fundamental mission is to serve as a forum for debate, discussion, and dissemination of issues relating to sustainable development in an African context. Sustain our Africa hosts an annual sustainability summit in October and runs a media platform to facilitate dialogue, spread information, and catalyse change.
